Anna Nagy (born 1965) is a Hungarian journalist. She served as spokesperson of the Hungarian government from 29 May 2010 to 12 September 2011.

Career
She obtained a degree in English studies at the School of English and American Studies of the Faculty of Humanities of the Eötvös Loránd University.

References
 Kormanyszovivo.hu

1965 births
Living people
21st-century Hungarian women politicians
Government spokespersons of Hungary